Razun may refer to:
 Razun, Mazandaran (رزون - Razūn)
 Razun, Razavi Khorasan (رازون - Rāzūn)